is a railway station in the town of Agui, Chita District,  Aichi Prefecture,  Japan, operated by Meitetsu.

Lines

Station layout
The station has two opposed side platforms connected by a level crossing. The platforms are short, and can handle trains of only six carriages or less. The station is unattended.

Platforms

Adjacent stations

Station history
The Chita Railway became part of the Meitetsu group on February 2, 1943. The station was renamed to its present name on December 1, 1949, and has also been unattended since 1949. In March 2007, the Tranpass system of magnetic fare cards with automatic turnstiles was implemented.

Passenger statistics
In fiscal 2017, the station was used by an average of 260 passengers daily (boarding passengers only).

Surrounding area
Agui Kitahara Nursing School

See also
 List of Railway Stations in Japan

References

External links

 Official web page 

Railway stations in Japan opened in 1931
Railway stations in Aichi Prefecture
Stations of Nagoya Railroad
Agui, Aichi